Alyona Olegovna Babenko (born March 31, 1972) is a Russian film and theater actress, Honored Artist of the Russian Federation (2013).

Biography
Elena Baranova, known professionally as Alyona Babenko was born in Kemerovo, Russian SFSR, Soviet Union (now Russia).

Mother — piano teacher, father Oleg Baranov — an engineer by training. In her childhood she studied in clubs and studios, went to a music school. She participated in festivals, performances and sang in the choir, in the vocal-instrumental ensemble. She dreamed of becoming a ballerina.

Was a fan of the French singer Edith Piaf.

Alyona graduated from school in 1988 and entered Tomsk State University in the Faculty of Applied Mathematics and Cybernetics. In her first year, Lena, by announcement, got into the Student Theater of Variety Miniatures. Amateur activities completely enticed her, and for the rest she practically did not have time. After the first course, she tried to enter the Moscow Art Theater to Oleg Tabakov, but failed. In her fifth year, Alena met Vitaly Babenko, a famous television director in Moscow. Alyona left the university and came to live in Moscow. Soon Alyona married Vitaly, and they had a son, Nikita. In Moscow, Alyona kept housekeeping, raised her son. In 2000, Alyona Babenko graduated from VGIK, the course was led by Anatoli Romashin.

Before finishing VGIK, Alyona made her debut in the TV series Kamenskaya, where she starred in several episodes. Best known for starring in  Pavel Chukhrai's film A Driver for Vera (2004), who brought her the Russian film awards Nika and  Golden Eagle.

Personal life
First husband Vitaliy Babenko, a Russian director and actor (divorced), son Nikita was born in 1992.
       
Second husband since 2011. Eduard Suboch, master of sports in ski jumping from a springboard, businessman.

Public position 
In 2014, she signed a collective appeal of cultural figures of the Russian Federation in support of the policy of the President of the Russian Federation Vladimir Putin in Ukraine and in  Crimea.

Selected filmography
 Kamenskaya as Katya (2000)
 A Driver for Vera as Vera Serova (2004)
 On Upper Maslovka as Nina (2006)
 Andersen. Life Without Love as Henriette Wulff / Alexandrine of Mecklenburg-Schwerin (2006)
 Indi as Arina (2007)
 Jolly Fellows as Alvetochka, journalist   (2009)
 High Security Vacation as  Tatyana Panteleeva   (2009)
 The Photographer as Kolya's mother (2014)
 Flight Crew as Margarita   (2016)
 After You're Gone as Chiara's mother (2017)
 Holiday as Margarita Voskresenskaya   (2019)

References

External links
 

1972 births
Living people
Russian film actresses
Russian stage actresses
Russian television actresses
Recipients of the Nika Award
Honored Artists of the Russian Federation
Gerasimov Institute of Cinematography alumni
20th-century Russian actresses
21st-century Russian actresses
People from Kemerovo